The Irish Traveller Movement (ITM) is a national organisation for members of the Travelling community and Traveller organisations in Ireland.

History 
The Irish Traveller Movement (ITM) was founded in 1990, with the chairperson Catherine Joyce. They represent 40 local and national Traveller groups from the island of Ireland.

Core Activities 
The ITM collects and publishes data and reports relating to living conditions, educational prospects, and other aspects of the lives of Irish Travellers. They advocate for:

They campaign for equality for Travellers in all aspects of life
They promote pride in the culture and identity of the Travelling community
They promote and produce evidence based solutions for all issues affecting the Travelling community

The Movement has been one of the groups, alongside Pavee Point, who have partnered with groups advocating for the Roma community. They have partnered with organisations such as St Stephen's Green Trust on programmes such as Travellers in Prison Initiative. They have held initiatives such as Traveller Focus Week from 2004. ITM was one of the groups which submitted recommendations to a Seanad Committee on the inclusion of Travellers in Irish public life. During the COVID-19 pandemic, the ITM highlighted the difficulty the Travelling communities have relating to access to clean water, toilets, and the cramped sites on which many families live. In response to the protests and demonstrations after the murder of George Floyd, ITM joined with other Traveller groups in calling for an "end to racism".

ITM is one of 7 not-for-profit organisations in Ireland which provide free legal advice, alongside Mercy Law Resource Centre, Ballymun Community Law Centre, the Immigrant Council of Ireland, the Irish Refugee Council, the Free Legal Advice Centres, and Northside Community Law Centre.

Traveller Pride Week 
The ITM is the coordinator of the Traveller Pride Week, which hosts the Traveller Pride Awards. They established the awards in 2009. Awards are given out across 7 fields: community, enterprise and employment, sport, education, intersectionality, youth, arts/culture, and music. Past winners have included Laura Angela Collins and Oein DeBhairduin.

References 

Irish Travellers
1990 establishments in Ireland